GR 8 (also known as UGC 8091) is a gas-rich dwarf irregular galaxy.
It is around 2.8 Mly from UGC 9128. It is still an open question whether it is a member of the Local Group.  

GR 8 was discovered at the Lick Observatory using the 20-inch astrograph in either 1946, 1947, or 1951.

References

External links
 Irregular Galaxy GR 8: Footprint Galaxy
 DDO 155 picture (almost halfway down page)

Dwarf irregular galaxies
Virgo (constellation)
08091
44491